Cherryland is an unincorporated community and census-designated place (CDP) in Alameda County, California, United States. Cherryland is located between Ashland to the north and the city of Hayward to the south. The population was 15,808 at the 2020 census.

History 
Cherryland largely comprises the residential subdivision of the vast orchards of San Lorenzo pioneer William Meek, often called the "first farmer" of Alameda County. "Cherryland" was the name of one huge subdivision of this farm initiated by third-generation heirs in 1911. The Meek Mansion is located on Hampton Road in the northern part of Cherryland. The mansion is maintained by the Hayward Area Recreation and Park District, in conjunction with the Hayward Area Historical Society.

Geography 
According to the United States Census Bureau, the CDP has a total area of 1.2 square miles (3.1 km), all of it land. San Lorenzo Creek runs partly through the unincorporated community and outlines most of the unincorporated community's northern border.

Climate
This region experiences warm (but not hot) and dry summers, with no average monthly temperatures above 71.6 °F.  According to the Köppen Climate Classification system, Cherryland has a warm-summer Mediterranean climate, abbreviated "Csb" on climate maps.

Demographics

2010
The racial makeup of the CDP in 2010 was 20.9% non-Hispanic White, 10.8% Black or African American, 0.4% Native American, 9.2% Asian, 1.9% Pacific Islander, 0.2% from other races, and 2.7% from two or more races. 54.0% of the population were Hispanic or Latino of any race.
The census reported that 14,272 people (96.9% of the population) lived in households, 277 (1.9%) lived in non-institutionalized group quarters, and 179 (1.2%) were institutionalized.

There were 4,643 households, 1,963 (42.3%) had children under the age of 18 living in them, 1,850 (39.8%) were opposite-sex married couples living together, 844 (18.2%) had a female householder with no husband present, 391 (8.4%) had a male householder with no wife present.  There were 447 (9.6%) unmarried opposite-sex partnerships, and 50 (1.1%) same-sex married couples or partnerships. 1,131 households (24.4%) were one person and 324 (7.0%) had someone living alone who was 65 or older. The average household size was 3.07.  There were 3,085 families (66.4% of households); the average family size was 3.64.

The age distribution was 3,956 people (26.9%) under the age of 18, 1,457 people (9.9%) aged 18 to 24, 4,728 people (32.1%) aged 25 to 44, 3,339 people (22.7%) aged 45 to 64, and 1,248 people (8.5%) who were 65 or older.  The median age was 32.3 years. For every 100 females, there were 101.9 males.  For every 100 females age 18 and over, there were 101.0 males.

There were 4,975 housing units at an average density of ,of which 4,643 were occupied, 1,458 (31.4%) by the owners and 3,185 (68.6%) by renters.  The homeowner vacancy rate was 1.5%; the rental vacancy rate was 5.4%.  4,439 people (30.1% of the population) lived in owner-occupied housing units and 9,833 people (66.8%) lived in rental housing units.

2000
At the 2000 census there were 13,837 people, 4,658 households, and 3,018 families living in the CDP.
Of the 4,658 households 37.2% had children under the age of 18 living with them, 41.0% were married couples living together, 16.0% had a female householder with no husband present, and 35.2% were non-families. 25.9% of households were one person and 7.6% were one person aged 65 or older.  The average household size was 2.87 and the average family size was 3.46.

The age distribution was 27.0% under the age of 18, 10.4% from 18 to 24, 35.6% from 25 to 44, 17.5% from 45 to 64, and 9.5% 65 or older.  The median age was 32 years. For every 100 females, there were 105.0 males.  For every 100 females age 18 and over, there were 101.0 males.

The median household income was $42,880 and the median family income was $44,319. Males had a median income of $34,830 versus $29,724 for females. The per capita income for the CDP was $16,929.  About 9.0% of families and 12.3% of the population were below the poverty line, including 13.9% of those under age 18 and 12.1% of those age 65 or over.

Parks and recreation 
Park and recreation services are provided by Hayward Area Recreation and Park District.

Government 
Cherryland is an unincorporated community of Alameda County, and thus is overseen by the Alameda County Board of Supervisors. In 2019, the Board of Supervisors created the Eden Area Municipal Advisory Council, an appointed council of seven community members, to assist the Board of Supervisors in policy decision making.

Education 
Cherryland is served by the Hayward Unified School District to the south and the San Lorenzo Unified School District to the north.

Infrastructure 
Water supply is provided by the East Bay Municipal Utility District and sanitation services by the Oro Loma Sanitary District Most other utility services are provided by private companies.

Public safety 
The area is policed by the Alameda County Sheriff's Office and the California Highway Patrol.  Fire and EMT services provided by Alameda County Fire Department.

Community organizations 
There are a number of volunteer community organizations including the Cherryland Community Association and Padres Unidos.

References

External links 
 San Lorenzo Express (local news)
 Cherryland Chamber of Commerce (Business news)

Census-designated places in Alameda County, California
Census-designated places in California